Owen Bank is a wholly submerged atoll structure in the Chagos Archipelago, Indian Ocean. The reported location is 06°47'S, 070°14'E to 06°48'S, 070°15'E, thus the bank is the westernmost feature of the Chagos group. The closest islands are Danger Island on the Great Chagos Bank, and Île Sipaille in the Egmont Atoll, both located about  East-North-East of Owen Bank.

This geographic feature is not mentioned in the current Indian Ocean Pilot, but it appears in the British Admiralty nautical charts.

References

External links
Indian Ocean Pilot (download PDF)
Satellite Views mentions Owen Bank

Chagos Archipelago